2011 Regional League Division 2 Central-East Region is the 3rd season of the League competition since its establishment in 2009. It is in the third tier of the Thai football league system.

Changes from Last Season

Team Changes

Promoted Clubs

Saraburi were promoted to the 2011 Thai Division 1 League.

Renamed Clubs

 Sa Kaeo United renamed Sa Kaeo City.
 Prachuap Khiri Khan renamed Prachuap.
 Kabinburi renamed Kabin City.

Relocated Clubs
Prachuap Khiri Khan re-located from the 2010 Thai Division 2 League Southern Region into the Central & Eastern Region.

Stadium and locations

League table

Results

References

External links
 Football Association of Thailand

Regional League Central-East Division seasons
Cen